Michalis Lygnos (born 12 February 1974) is a Greek retired football defender.

References

1974 births
Living people
Greek footballers
Atromitos F.C. players
Paniliakos F.C. players
Panachaiki F.C. players
A.O. Kerkyra players
Super League Greece players
Association football defenders
People from Syros
Sportspeople from the South Aegean